Dagbani (or Dagbane), also known as Dagbanli and Dagbanle, is a Gur language spoken in Ghana and Northern Togo. Its native speakers are estimated around 3,160,000. This number increases to more than 6,000,000 if mutually intelligible languages such as mamprusi are added. It is a compulsory subject in primary and junior high school in the Dagbon Kingdom, which covers the north eastern part of Ghana. Dagbani is the most widely spoken language in northern Ghana, especially among tribes overseen by the King of Dagbon, the Yaa-Naa.

It is closely related to and mutually intelligible with the Mampelle language, also spoken in Northern Region, Ghana. Dagbani is also similar to the other languages of the same subgroup spoken in this region, the Dagaare and Wali languages, spoken in Upper West Region of Ghana, and the Frafra language, spoken in Upper East Region of Ghana.

In Togo 
In Togo, Dagbani is spoken in the Savanes Region at the border with Ghana.

Dialects
Dagbani has a major dialect split between Eastern Dagbani, centred on the traditional capital town of Yendi, and Western Dagbani, centred on the administrative capital of the Northern Region, Tamale. The dialects are, however, mutually intelligible, and mainly consist of different root vowels in some lexemes, and different forms or pronunciations of some nouns, particularly those referring to local flora. The words Dagbani and Dagbanli given above for the name of the language are respectively the Eastern and Western dialect forms of the name, but the Dagbani Orthography Committee resolved that “It was decided that in the spelling system <Dagbani> is used to refer to the ... Language, and <Dagbanli> ... to the life and culture”; in the spoken language, each dialect uses its form of the name for both functions.

Orthography
Dagbani is written in a Latin alphabet with the addition of the apostrophe, the letters ɛ, ɣ, ŋ, ɔ, and ʒ, and the digraphs ch, gb, kp, ŋm, sh and ny. The literacy rate used to be only 2–3%. This percentage is expected to rise as Dagbani is now a compulsory subject in primary and junior secondary school all over Dagbon. The orthography currently used (Orthography Committee /d(1998)) represents a number of allophonic distinctions. Tone is not marked.

Phonology

Vowels

Dagbani has eleven phonemic vowels – six short vowels and five long vowels:

Allophonic variation based on tongue-root advancement is well attested for 4 of these vowels:  ~ ,  ~ ,  ~  and  ~ .

Consonants

 [] mainly occurs phonemically among other Western dialects.
  debuccalizes as a glottal  when in intervocalic position.  debuccalizes as a glottal stop  post-vocalic position.
 Sounds  are realized as  when preceding front vowels.
  can be heard as  when in post-vocalic positions.

Tone
Dagbani is a tonal language in which pitch is used to distinguish words, as in gballi  (high-high) 'grave' vs. gballi  (high-low) 'zana mat'. The tone system of Dagbani is characterised by two level tones and downstep (a lowering effect occurring between sequences of the same phonemic tone).

Grammar
Dagbani is agglutinative, but with some fusion of affixes. The constituent order in Dagbani sentences is usually agent–verb–object.

Lexicon
There is an insight into a historical stage of the language in the papers of Rudolf Fisch reflecting data collected during his missionary work in the German Togoland colony in the last quarter of the nineteenth century, especially the lexical list, though there is also some grammatical information and sample texts. A more modern glossary was published in 1934 by a southern Ghanaian officer of the colonial government, E. Foster Tamakloe, in 1934, with a revised edition by British officer Harold Blair. Various editors added to the wordlist and a more complete publication was produced in 2003 by a Dagomba scholar, Ibrahim Mahama. According to the linguist Salifu Nantogma Alhassan, there is evidence to suggest that there are gender-related double standards in the Dagbani language with "more labels that trivialise females than males." Meanwhile, the data was electronically compiled by John Miller Chernoff and Roger Blench (whose version is published online), and converted to a database by Tony Naden, on the basis of which a full-featured dictionary is ongoing and can be viewed online.

Noun Class System

Pronouns
Each set of personal pronouns in Dagbani is distinguished regarding person, number and animacy. Besides the distinction between singular and plural, there is an additional distinction between [+/- animate] in the 3rd person. Moreover, Dagbani distinguishes between emphatic and non-emphatic pronouns and there are no gender distinctions. While there is no morphological differentiation between grammatical cases, pronouns can occur in different forms according to whether they appear pre- or postverbally.

Non-emphatic Pronouns

Preverbal 
Preverbal pronouns serve as subjects of a verb and are all monosyllabic.

Postverbal 
Postverbal pronouns usually denote objects.

Given the fact that preverbal and postverbal pronouns do not denote two complementary sets, one could refer to them as unmarked or specifically marked for postverbal occurrence.

Emphatic Pronouns 
Emphatic pronouns in Dagbani serve as regular pronouns in that they can stand in isolation, preverbally or postverbally.

Reciprocal Pronouns 
Reciprocals are formed by the addition of the word taba after the verb.

Reflexive Pronouns 
Reflexive pronouns are formed by the suffix -maŋa, which is attached to the non-emphatic preverbal pronoun.

The affix maŋa can also occur as an emphatic pronoun after nouns.

Possessive Pronouns 
The possessive pronouns in Dagbani exactly correspond to the preverbal non-emphatic pronouns, which always proceed the possessed constituent.

Relative Pronouns 
In Dagbani the relative pronouns are ŋʊn ("who") and ni ("which").

The relative pronouns in Dagbani are not obligatory present and can also be absent depending on the context, as the following example illustrates.

Relative pronouns in Dagbani can also be complex in its nature, such that they consist of two elements, an indefinite pronoun and an emphatic pronoun.

Interrogative Pronouns 
Interrogative pronouns in Dagbani make a distinction between human and non-human. 

Additionally, interrogative pronouns inflect for number, but not all of them. Those inflecting for number belong to the semantic categories [ +THING], [ +SELECTION], [ +PERSON].

Demonstrative Pronouns 
Demonstrative pronouns in Dagbani make a morphological difference between the singular and plural form. The demonstrative pronoun ŋɔ moves to the specifier of the functional NumP and if Num is plural, then the plural morphem -nímá attaches to the demonstrative pronoun. If Num is singular, there is a zero morphem, such that the demonstrative pronoun does not differ in its morphological form.

Indefinite Pronouns 
Dagbani distinguishes not only between singular and plural for indefinite pronouns, but also between [+/-animate]. Therefore, there are two pairs of indefinite pronouns. Indefinites are basically used in the same way as adjectives, as their morphological form is similar to that of nouns and adjectives. In order to express an indefinite like "something" the inanimate singular form is combined with the noun bini ("thing").

Syntax

Word Order
Dagbani has a rigid SVO word order. In the canonical sentence structure, the verb precedes the direct and indirect object as well as adverbials. The clause structure exhibits varying functional elements projecting various functional phrasal categories including tense, aspect, negation, mood and the conjoint/disjoint paradigm.

Verb Phrase
The VP in Dagbani consists of a preverbal particle encoding tense, aspect and mood, the main verb, and a postverbal particle which marks focus.

Preverbal Particles

Major Particles

Main Verb 

Each verb in Dagbani has two forms, a perfective and an imperfective form with very few exceptions. In general, the perfective form is the unmarked form, whereas the imperfective form corresponds to the progressive form, or in other words it refers to an action, which is still in progress. The perfective is nearly syncretic with the infinitive, which in turn has an /n-/-prefix. The imperfective is formed by the suffix /-di/.

The inflectional system in Dagbani is relatively poor as compared to other languages. There is no grammatical agreement, since number and person are not marked. Tense is marked only under certain constraints. Basically, Dagbani makes a distinction between future and non-future, however the main distinction does not concern Tense, but Aspect and occurs between perfective and imperfective.

Postverbal Particles 
The postverbal particle la marks presentational focus, rather than contrastive focus. In comparison to the postverbal particle in Dagaare, the function of this Dagbani particle is also not yet fully investigated. There are native speakers, who consider the particle to indicate that what is expressed to the hearer is not shared knowledge. Issah (2013) on the other hand argues that the presence of la asserts new information, while its absence indicates old information.

Conjoint / Disjoint Markers

Questions
In Dagbani, the question word can either appear in situ or ex situ.

Ex situ

The basic word order in Dagbani questions is SVO, such that the question word is fronted and followed by the focus marker ka. This is the unmarked form and accepted by many native speakers as "natural".

In situ
Yes-/No-question in Dagbani are formed by the disjunction bee ('or'), which either conjoints two propositions or which occurs sentence-finally to indicate that the sentence with SVO order is actually a question. 

In addition to Yes-/No-questions, the question word can also occur in sentence-final position. This might correspond to echo questions.

Dagbani language scholars
 Fusheini Hudu
 Knut Olawsky
 Roger Blench
 Tony Naden
 Samuel Alhassan Issah

References

External links

Knut Olawsky's Homepage
The UCLA Phonetics Lab Archive – Dagbani
Dagbani kasahorow online dictionary
Dagbane dictionary (PDF)
The VP-periphery in Mabia languages

 
Oti–Volta languages
Languages of Ghana